The chilling requirement of a fruit is the minimum period of cold weather after which a fruit-bearing tree will blossom.  It is often expressed in chill hours, which can be calculated in different ways, all of which essentially involve adding up the total amount of time in a winter spent at certain temperatures.

Some bulbs have chilling requirements to bloom, and some seeds have chilling requirements to sprout.

Biologically, the chilling requirement is a way of ensuring that vernalization occurs.

Chilling units or chilling hours 
A chilling unit in agriculture is a metric of a plant's exposure to chilling temperatures. Chilling temperatures extend from freezing point to, depending on the model,  or even . Stone fruit trees and certain other plants of temperate climate develop next year's buds in the summer. In the autumn the buds become dormant, and the switch to proper, healthy dormancy is triggered by a certain minimum exposure to chilling temperatures. Lack of such exposure results in delayed and substandard foliation, flowering and fruiting. One chilling unit, in the simplest models, is equal to one hour's exposure to the chilling temperature; these units are summed up for a whole season. Advanced models assign different weights to different temperature bands.

Requirements

According to Fishman, chilling in trees acts in two stages. The first is reversible: chilling helps to build up the precursor to dormancy, but the process can be easily reversed with a rise in temperature. After the level of precursor reaches a certain threshold, dormancy becomes irreversible and will not be affected by short-term warm temperature peaks. Apples have the highest chilling requirements of all fruit trees, followed by apricots and, lastly, peaches. Apple cultivars have a diverse range of permissible minimum chilling: most have been bred for temperate weather, but Gala and Fuji can be successfully grown in subtropical Bakersfield, California.

Peach cultivars in Texas range in their requirements from 100 chilling units (Florida Grande cultivar, zoned for low chill regions) to 1,000 units (Surecrop, zoned for high chill regions). Planting a low-chilling cultivar in a high-chill region risks loss of a year's harvest when an early bloom is hit by a spring frost. A high-chilling cultivar planted in a low-chill region will, quite likely, never fruit at all. A four-year study of Ruston Red Alabama peach, which has a threshold of 850 chilling units, demonstrated that a seasonal chilling deficiency of less than 50 units has no effect on harvest. Deficiency of 50 to 100 units may result in loss of up to 50% of expected harvest. Deficiency of 250 hours and more is a sure loss of practically whole harvest; the few fruit will be of very poor quality and have no market value. Rest-breaking agents (e.g. hydrogen cyanamide, trade name BudPro or Dormex), applied in spring, can partially mitigate the effects of insufficient chilling. BudPro can substitute for up to 300 hours of chilling, but an excessive spraying and timing error can easily damage the buds.
Other products such as Dormex use stabilizing compounds.

Chilling of orange trees has two effects. First, it increases production of carotenoids and decreases chlorophyll content of the fruit, improving their appearance and, ultimately, their market value. Second, the "quasi-dormancy" experienced by orange trees triggers concentrated flowering in spring, as opposed to more or less uniform round-the-year flowering and fruiting in warmer climates.

Biennial plants like cabbage, sugar beet, celery and carrots need chilling to develop second-year flowering buds. Excessive chilling in the early stages of a sugar beet seedling, on the contrary, may trigger undesired growth of a flowering stem (bolting) in its first year. This phenomenon has been offset by breeding sugar beet cultivars with a higher minimum chilling threshold. Such cultivars can be seeded earlier than normal without the risk of bolting.

Models

All models require hourly recording of temperatures. The simplest model assigns one chilling unit for every full hour at temperatures below .
 

Southwick et al. wrote that neither of these models is accurate enough to account for application of rest-breaking agents widely used in modern farming. They advocated the use of a dynamic model tailored to the two-stage explanation of dormancy.

References

External links
 Harvest Prediction Model for the counties and towns of California. University of California Agricultural and Natural Resources.
gardenweb discussion of chilling requirements
permaculture discussion of chilling requirements 
chill accumulation calculator for wunderground.com weather stations

Horticulture
Meteorological indices
Plant physiology